Sam Kaplan may refer to:
Sam Kaplan (American football) 
Sam Kaplan, anthropologist and author of The Pedagogical State
Samuel L. Kaplan, US ambassador to Morocco
Character in Street Scene, both the film and play